The women's shot put event at the 1991 Summer Universiade was held at the Don Valley Stadium in Sheffield on 24 July 1991.

Results

References

Athletics at the 1991 Summer Universiade
1991